Municipal elections were held across Latvia on 3 June 2017.  All 119 municipalities and republican cities of Latvia elected their city councils.  In Riga the joint list of the Social Democratic Party "Harmony" and Honor to serve Riga won a majority.

Results 
The following map shows the results of the local elections in different territories of Latvia. The colour, which each territory has, indicates the party, which received the majority of votes in this territory.

Riga

Daugavpils

Liepāja

Jelgava

References

2017
2017 in Latvia
2017 elections in Europe